Arnaldo Cinquetti (born 7 November 1953) is an Italian former swimmer who competed in the 1972 Summer Olympics.

References

1953 births
Living people
Italian male swimmers
Italian male freestyle swimmers
Olympic swimmers of Italy
Swimmers at the 1972 Summer Olympics
Mediterranean Games gold medalists for Italy
Mediterranean Games medalists in swimming
Swimmers at the 1971 Mediterranean Games